The Government of the 12th Dáil or the 4th Government of Ireland (9 June 1944 – 18 February 1948) was the government of Ireland formed after the 1944 general election held on 30 May. It was a single-party Fianna Fáil government led by Éamon de Valera as Taoiseach. Fianna Fáil had been in office since the 1932 general election.

The 4th Government lasted for  days.

4th Government of Ireland

Nomination of Taoiseach
The members of the 12th Dáil first met on 9 June 1944. In the debate on the nomination of Taoiseach, Fianna Fáil leader and outgoing Taoiseach Éamon de Valera was proposed. This motion was approved by 81 to 37. De Valera was appointed as Taoiseach by President Douglas Hyde.

Members of the Government
After his appointment as Taoiseach by the president, Éamon de Valera proposed the members of the government and they were approved by the Dáil. They were appointed by the president on the same day.

Note

Parliamentary Secretaries
On 9 June, the Government appointed Parliamentary Secretaries on the nomination of the Taoiseach.

See also
Dáil Éireann
Constitution of Ireland
Politics of the Republic of Ireland

References

Governments of Ireland
1944 establishments in Ireland
1948 disestablishments in Ireland
Cabinets established in 1944
Cabinets disestablished in 1948
12th Dáil